The Mălina is a left tributary of the river Siret in Romania. It discharges into the Siret in Movileni, near the city Galați.

References

Rivers of Romania
Rivers of Galați County